Sidney Macdonald Bishop (10 February 1900 – 4 May 1949) was an English footballer whose main position was right-sided half-back, although he also sometimes played as an inside forward.

Career
Bishop began his days as a footballer playing for London Schools, as well as playing Air Force Football during the First World War. Bishop continued his career at Ilford, before moving on to Crystal Palace.

Bishop transferred to West Ham United in 1920 and was part of the West Ham team that won promotion to the First Division and also appeared in the famous White Horse Final, the first FA Cup final at the brand new Wembley Stadium, during the 1922–23 season.

He played for them until November 1926, making 172 appearances and netting 10 goals. He became known affectionately by the fans of West Ham as Sticks.

Bishop went on to play club football for Leicester City where he gained England international recognition, winning four caps, the first of them against Scotland on 2 April 1927 (in a later era he might have played for Scotland, as his mother was from Aberdeenshire). He also scored one goal for England in the 86th minute of a match against Luxembourg on 21 May 1927 which England won 5–2.

He moved to Chelsea in June 1928 for £4,500 and made over 100 appearances for the club before retiring in May 1933.

References

External links
 Sid Bishop Photographs

English footballers
Chelsea F.C. players
Crystal Palace F.C. players
Ilford F.C. players
England international footballers
Leicester City F.C. players
Footballers from Stepney
West Ham United F.C. players
1900 births
1949 deaths
English Football League players
English Football League representative players
Association football wing halves
English people of Scottish descent
Association football inside forwards
FA Cup Final players